Collector of Names is a horror novel by Miha Mazzini. It was first published in Slovenia in 1993 and it was finalist of Vladimir Slejko Prize for the best novel of the year.

Plot
The story is set on the small island in the Mediterranean Sea. Students are coming to party, local pensioners are having their own fun and suddenly there is a child among them asking them for their names. The person who answers him actually gives away his name and identity and sink into the horror of personal annihilation.

References 
 Miha Mazzini's web page

1993 novels
Slovenian novels